Seth Wickersham is an American sports journalist for ESPN and ESPN The Magazine.

Wickersham is native of Anchorage, Alaska and attended Robert Service High School. He has written for ESPN.com and ESPN The Magazine since graduating from the University of Missouri in 2000. His work primarily covers the National Football League (NFL) and has been featured on Outside the Lines, SportsCenter, NFL Live, The Ryen Russillo Show, and E:60. In his 18 years at ESPN, he has profiled the likes of Tom Brady, Peyton Manning, Bill Belichick, John Elway, Odell Beckham, Jr., Bill Walsh, Jim Harbaugh, and Y.A. Tittle, among others, and he has written deep dives into strained relationships within the Cleveland Browns, Seattle Seahawks and the New England Patriots. Along with senior writer Don Van Natta, Wickersham has written critically acclaimed investigations on the NFL's handling of the Spygate and Deflategate cheating controversies, the Rams and Raiders franchise relocations, the behind-closed-doors meetings on the inequality protests, and the efforts by Jerry Jones to block Roger Goodell’s contract extension.

Outside of the NFL, Wickersham has written about Gregg Popovich, race horse euthanasia, the plight of a fired college basketball coach, suicidal Kenyan runners in Alaska, Bangkok ping-pong championships, and NCAA compliance officers. He also once interviewed legendary Queen guitarist Brian May about “We Will Rock You,” the most-played stadium anthem ever.

In 2018, Wickersham was a finalist for the National Magazine Award for Reporting. His stories have been anthologized in the Best American Magazine Writing, the Best American Sports Writing, Next Wave: America's New Generation of Great Literary Journalists, and in Words Matter: Writing to Make a Difference. He has won awards from the National Association of Black Journalists and the Pro Football Writers Association.

In the fall of 2021, Wickersham’s book It’s Better to Be Feared: The New England Patriots Dynasty and the Pursuit of Greatness was released. It was a New York Times bestseller and was named Nonfiction Book of the Year by Sports Illustrated.  

He is credited as playing himself in the 2014 movie Draft Day, though the scene was cut before it was shot.

References

External links
 

Date of birth missing (living people)
University of Missouri alumni
Writers from Anchorage, Alaska
American sportswriters
ESPN people
Living people
Year of birth missing (living people)